Nina H. Fefferman (born December 20, 1978) is an American evolutionary biologist, epidemiologist, and ecologist at the University of Tennessee for the Departments of Ecology and Evolution & Mathematics. Her research focuses on the mathematics of epidemiology, evolutionary & behavioral ecology, and conservation biology. She studies how individual behaviors can affect an entire population.

Early life and education 
Nina Fefferman is the daughter of Julie and Charles Fefferman; her father is a mathematician at Princeton University.

She studied mathematics to get her bachelor's degree in science from Princeton in 1999. She later received her Master of Science degree from Rutgers University in 2001 and her Ph.D. in biology from Tufts University in 2005. Her thesis was on using mathematical models in evolutionary biology and epidemiology.

Publications 
Her most cited papers are:

 Lofgren E, Fefferman NH, Naumov YN, Gorski J, Naumova EN. Influenza seasonality: underlying causes and modeling theories. Journal of virology. 2007 Jun 1;81(11):5429-36.
 Wilson-Rich N, Spivak M, Fefferman NH, Starks PT. Genetic, individual, and group facilitation of disease resistance in insect societies. Annual review of entomology. 2009 Jan 7;54:405-23.
 Parham PE, Waldock J, Christophides GK, Hemming D, Agusto F, Evans KJ, Fefferman N, Gaff H, Gumel A, LaDeau S, Lenhart S. Climate, environmental and socio-economic change: weighing up the balance in vector-borne disease transmission. Philosophical Transactions of the Royal Society B: Biological Sciences. 2015 Apr 5;370(1665):20130551. 
 Lofgren ET, Fefferman NH. The untapped potential of virtual game worlds to shed light on real world epidemics. The Lancet Infectious Diseases. 2007 Sep 1;7(9):625-9.

Projects 
Nina Fefferman has been involved in numerous research centers. She was a principal investigator at START (US Dept of Homeland Security Center for the Study of Terrorism and Responses to Terrorism)  in a research team working to understand the social behavior and algorithms involved in the extremism of terrorism. She was an active participant at DIMACS (The Center for Discrete Mathematics and Theoretical Computer Science) to aid in collaborations and conferences about mathematical macrobiology. She served as a principal investigator at CCICADA (US Dept of Homeland Security Command, Control, and Interoperability Center for Advanced Data Analysis) to research the social behavior of technologically enabled environments by using data analysis.                                                    

She was a center co-director at InForMID (Tufts University Initiative for the Forecasting and Modeling of Infectious Diseases) as a researcher and lead in the area of mathematical modeling of infectious disease epidemiology. She was an active participant at NIMBioS (National Institute for Mathematical and Biological Synthesis) and worked in the leadership team to organize tutorials, mentor summer programs, and serve as founding director for Mathematical Modeling Counseling Center.

References

External links 
 https://eeb.utk.edu/people/nina-fefferman/
 https://www.bbvaopenmind.com/en/science/mathematics/interview-charles-fefferman
 http://feffermanlab.org/fefferman-cv.pdf
 

Living people
American biologists
American women biologists
20th-century American mathematicians
American women mathematicians
Theoretical biologists
Princeton University alumni
Rutgers University alumni
Tufts University School of Arts and Sciences alumni
University of Tennessee faculty
21st-century American mathematicians
1978 births
20th-century American women
21st-century American women